Swedish Evangelical Lutheran Church, now known as Swedesburg Evangelical Lutheran Church, is a historic church located in Swedesburg, Iowa, United States. The congregation was officially organized in 1866 by the Swedish Lutheran congregation from New Sweden in Jefferson County, Iowa. The present church was built in 1928 as the third church to stand on the same site. The first frame church, built in 1868, was destroyed in a fire in 1883. The second frame church, with a  tower, was completed the same year. In 1927 it too was also destroyed by fire. The congregation hired Burlington, Iowa architect W.F. Weibley to design the present Late Gothic Revival church building. It is composed of tan brick with Bedford stone trim. The church was added to the National Register of Historic Places in 1999.

The congregation began to use English instead of Swedish in their programming beginning with the children's Sunday School classes in 1910. The men's Sunday School class was the last group to switch to English in the 1920s. The Rev. Delmar Karstens, who was called in 1966, was the first pastor who was not of Swedish descent. The congregation, however, continued to observe its Swedish traditions.

References

External links
Swedesburg Evangelical Lutheran Church website
Swedesburg Evangelical Lutheran Church records (Swenson Swedish Immigration Research Center)

Religious organizations established in 1866
Churches completed in 1928
Swedesburg, Iowa
Lutheran churches in Iowa
Churches on the National Register of Historic Places in Iowa
Gothic Revival church buildings in Iowa
20th-century Lutheran churches in the United States
National Register of Historic Places in Henry County, Iowa
Swedish-American culture in Iowa